The Harvey Grammar School is located in Folkestone, Kent, England. It is a grammar school with academy status founded by the family of William Harvey in 1674.

Admissions
A selective school for boys only, the school has around 900 on its roll. Although officially known as the Harvey Grammar School, it is called The Harvey by many locals or abbreviated to HGS, as its partner school the Folkestone School for Girls is known "FSG".

The school is situated on the A2034 (once the A20) at the junction of the B2064 and near the Folkestone West railway station, Folkestone Cricket Club, Folkestone Optimists Hockey Club at the Three Hills Sports Park and Folkestone Invicta F.C. It is easily accessed from the last junction of the M20 motorway.

History
The grammar school was established in 1674, following the death of William Harvey, the eminent physician and discoverer of the major details of blood circulation. A small class with one schoolmaster was first created, until Eliab Harvey, William's nephew, acting as executor of his uncle's will, founded a larger school of the name.

In July 1921, the body of the headmaster of the day, 43-year-old Major Harold Arthur Denham, was found in undergrowth in Hawkinge with self-inflicted bullet wounds. An inquest later arrived at a verdict of "suicide while temporarily insane".

Leadership and structure
The school has a well established house system, with four houses (Discovery, Endeavour, Resolution and Victory) that use the colours green, blue, red and yellow respectively. Each house is split into 5 separate forms and split between junior and senior (e.g., DJ1, DS1, EJ1, ES1, etc)  The current head teacher is Scott Norman and current Chair of Governors is John Dennis. The current Head Boy is Arthur Yeomans (Victory), and the current Deputy Head boy is Samuel Casey (Victory).

The school
The main school site is situated in the Folkestone suburb of Cheriton. It has been there since 1912-13 when the main building was constructed. In 1989, school buildings in the town centre, next to the Folkestone Library, were closed on completion of a new Science & Technology Block on the main site. A sports hall was added in 1997 and, in 2001, a further building was added with facilities for ICT, Art, Business Studies and Biology; this was named the John Edwards Centre in 2002 in honour of the school's headmaster from 1986 to 2002. In 2015, a new 12 classroom building was added and named the Wright building in honour of Bill Wright, who served as headteacher between 2008 and 2014. In 2017, a new P.E block was constructed of which includes a gymnasium and fitness suite along with 2 classrooms for the Religious Studies department. This new block is annexed with the current Sports Hall. The school also boasts an adjacent sports field named in honour of long serving Head of PE Alan Philpott, with a cricket pavilion named after former pupil Les Ames (Kent and England wicketkeeper-batsman); money for this was raised by the Old Harveians Association under the leadership of its President, John Smith. The pavilion was opened in 1997 by Colin Cowdrey in a ceremony also attended by Godfrey Evans, another famous former Kent and England wicketkeeper. In a special match to mark the pavilion opening, the school's 1st XI cricket team played a celebrity team that included ex Kent and England opening batsmen Brian Luckhurst and Mike Denness. The school also benefits from the proximity of the Three Hills sports facilities.

The Harvey's badge is worn by all boys 11–16 on their school uniform. The badge is inscribed with 'Temeraire Redoutable et Fougueux'. The uniform consists of a black blazer with badge, black trousers and black shoes, a white shirt and a tie. The tie of which uses the colour corresponding to the pupil's house, in a diagonal-stripe fashion. The sixth form wear a different, less strict but still formal suit of their choice, with a different tie which is plain black with the school badge insignia emblem. Once they have reached the sixth form, this can rise to have a single house-coloured stripe diagonally across, to denote prefect status.

The Harvey has an excellent record in sport across the county of Kent and beyond. It has reached more county football and cricket finals than any other school in Kent, a proud tradition largely established by long-standing Head of PE Alan Philpott (1957–92) (alumnus).

Academic record
The school was rated as outstanding in all areas by OFSTED in 2016. Academic standards are high, and many of the boys achieve good GCSE grades. The majority go onto the Sixth Form which was praised by OFSTED in 2016. OFSTED also praised the school for the pastoral care of its students which includes continual revision of targets and parent information evenings for GCSE options, Sixth Form study and parent evenings. The flexibility offered by the school, especially at A Level where it works very closely with the Folkestone School for Girls to provide an extensive range of subjects, makes it a popular choice in the area. The Harvey often achieves above 60% A*-B grades at A Level and close to 100% 5 A*-C at GCSE.

Michael Howard, former local MP and former Leader of the Conservative Party, described the Harvey as "a jewel in Folkestone's crown" at a school prize-giving, whilst the Good State Schools Guide refers to the Harvey as "a potent mix of friendliness and formality, of tradition and innovation".

Many school leavers choose to go on to study a wide range of degree subjects at university. A handful of students apply to Oxford or Cambridge each year, with successful applications in the last few years in subjects including Theology, Religion and Philosophy of Religion, Natural Sciences, Mathematics with Physics, English Language and Literature, Anglo-Saxon, Norse & Celtic and Philosophy, Politics & Economics.

Specialist and academy status
The school converted to academy status on 1 August 2012 and holds specialisms in Sport, Mathematics and Computing.

Community involvement
The Harvey promotes charities very strongly and has raised around £300,000 for charity, previously through an Annual Sponsored Walk around the surrounding coastline and/or countryside. It involved all students (992) setting out along a marshalled route with sponsored cards, helping raise money for charity.
An annual Prizegiving Day is held at the Leas Cliff Hall in Folkestone to recognise those boys who have achieved a high standard in academic and/or sporting activities. Guest speaker in 2018 was Edward Argar who is a Member of Parliament for the constituency of Charnwood since the 2015 elections and a former pupil of the school. The Headmaster, Chair of Governors, Head Boy and Guest Speaker are invited onto the stage to make speeches and then prizes are presented to the recipients.

Extra-curricular activities
There is an extensive range of trips: to the United States for football and computing, to Barbados for cricket, and Barcelona and the Netherlands for hockey and basketball. The football trips to the USA have taken place every other year since 1989. The 2009 trip saw the Harvey return home undefeated, having comprehensively beaten Susquehanna Valley High School, Conklin, New York, Owego Free Academy, and Seton Catholic Central High School, Binghamton. Cricket tours to Barbados regularly take place together with the USA football tours. The Barbados tours replaced the highly popular annual cricket tours to the West Country. In the past twenty years, over 1200 students have taken part in the school's annual ski trip. Curriculum-related trips to France, form an integral part of the school's Languages programme, whilst a History trip to Ypres is an annual event. The school has a Duke of Edinburgh's Award programme, highly successful Young Enterprise groups in the sixth form, and an award-winning Debating Group. Music and Drama are also an integral part of Harvey life with various musical groups in place, an annual pantomime and regular showcase nights.

Two annual 'proms' (formerly known as "Len' Balls") are held in conjunction with the Folkestone School for Girls each year at a large venue within the Folkestone area, one for the outgoing year 11's and one for the outgoing year 13's. This provides the opportunity for the school leavers to come together to celebrate their passing from school to further education or employment.

The school's secret war contribution at Station X

Three former staff and a pupil at the Harvey worked at the once secret code breaking centre at Bletchley Park in Milton Keynes, which was recently made public and has become a tourist attraction. Their unique roles are honoured on a plaque in the school hall. The school's Headmaster Oliver Berthoud (1946–1952) was there, as was the school's long-serving secretary Miss Audrey Wind. Although they worked closely in the school it was not until a discussion one day in Mr Berthoud's office that he managed to get Miss Wind to admit to her involvement and they spoke at length about their time there.

On a visit to the school in late 2006 Miss Wind commented that no one was allowed to talk about their involvement. They were sworn to secrecy and it was amazing that four Harveians had worked for Ultra during the war. She is the sole survivor of the four but now in her eighties still gives talks on the topic at functions and at the school to boys studying the period. Following her half-century of service to the school, Miss Wind became the first and only female member of the school's old boys' association.

Buildings

 Main Building - as seen from Cheriton Road
 Edwards Centre - named after former headmaster E.J. Edwards
 Wright Building - named after former headmaster W. T. Wright
 Science Block - incorporating Design & Technology and Performing Arts
 Sixth Form Centre
 Diner
 Sports Hall & Gym

Notable former pupils

 Ronnie Aldrich - leader of the Squadronaires band
 Les Ames, Kent and England wicket-keeper-batsman
 Edward Argar MP, the Conservative Member of Parliament for Charnwood.
 Arthur David Baker, Professor, Queens College, City University of New York, NY, USA
 Mark D Baker, Professor, University of Guelph, Guelph, Ontario, Canada
 Michael Baker (academic), Professor of Marketing from 1971 to 1999 at the University of Strathclyde, and President from 1986 to 2005 of the Academy of Marketing
 Toby Booth, first team coach at Bath Rugby rugby union club
 Air Marshal Sir Leslie Bower CB DFC DSO
 Andrew Brownsword, former greeting card magnate and currently owner of Bath Rugby Club, worth £195m (163 Times Rich List 2003). Owns the aBode chain of hotels.
 Alex Cornish, singer-songwriter
 Tom Fletcher CMG, Government advisor, former British ambassador, and Principal of Hertford College, Oxford.
 Maj-Gen Alfred Gadd CBE, Director of Army Education from 1962–65.
 Sir George Gardiner, Conservative MP for Reigate from 1974 to 1997, former Chairman of the 92 Group
 Lewis Harmer, Drapers Professor of French from 1951 to 1967 at the University of Cambridge
 Steven Heard, British Olympic 800m runner, attended the school from 1973 to 1980.
 Charlie Hemphrey, cricketer.
 Peter Hogben, prominent clergyman.
 Sam Homewood, television presenter. Left the school in 2007.
 Richard Huckle (born 1986), convicted sex offender; dubbed "Britain's worst paedophile"
 Lord Imbert of New Romney, formerly Peter Imbert, Commissioner of the Metropolitan Police, who played a role in bringing the Balcombe Street siege to a conclusion.
 David Johnson CMG CVO, High Commissioner to Guyana and Ambassador to Suriname from 1993-8
 Peter Kircher, former drummer with rock group Status Quo, was a pupil at the school in the 1950s and early 1960s
 Howard Losty, Director from 1971 to 1977 of the (GEC) Hirst Research Centre
 Michael Mingos, Principal of St Edmund Hall, Oxford and Professor of Inorganic Chemistry in the University of Oxford.
 Ken Packer, Professor in Chemistry, University of Nottingham from 1993 to 2001, and Editor from 1982-8 of Molecular Physics
 Noel Redding, played bass guitar in the Jimi Hendrix Experience (there is a mural painting celebrating him near the school office, painted on site in sections by the pupils)
 Athol Riddell MBE, Professor of Surgery from 1964 to 1974 at the University of Bristol, and based at Southmead Hospital
 Gerald Sinstadt, television sports commentator
 Ian Stewart, mathematician
 Robert Tavernor, Emeritus Professor of Architecture and Urban Design at the London School of Economics (LSE)
 Anthony R. West, British chemist, and Professor of Electroceramics and Solid State Chemistry at the University of Sheffield.
 Tim Wren, Kent County cricketer.

References

External links
 ××
 Harvey Grammar School Website
 Old Boys' (Alumni) Website
 EduBase

Grammar schools in Kent
Boys' schools in Kent
Educational institutions established in the 1670s
Folkestone
1674 establishments in England
Academies in Kent